Vaastu Shastra is a low budget 2004 Indian horror film produced by Ram Gopal Varma and directed by Saurab Narang, starring Peeya Rai Chowdhary, Sushmita Sen, and J. D. Chakravarthy. It was released on 22nd October 2004, and was declared a flop at the box office. Vaastu Shastra was dubbed into Telugu as Marri Chettu.

Plot 

Dinesh Dubey, who works at a school, goes to a house where a haunted tree is located. He is killed by unseen forces. The story then moves around a couple, Virag Rao and Jhilmil Rao, buying a new house in the suburbs of Mumbai (where Dinesh Dubey died). Jhilmil, a gynaecologist, and her husband Virag work round the clock — and are hardly present for their little son, Rohan. The problem arises when Jhilmil and Virag find out that Rohan has started making imaginary friends. Rohan starts getting obsessed with his "friends" — Manish and Jyoti, two kids, as well as Dinesh Dubey and his witch wife, who are actually ghosts.

Rukma joins Jhilmil's house as a new maid. Rukma learns about Manish and Jyoti while babysitting Rohan. Rohan points under the bed where Manish and Jyoti are hiding. When Rukma peeps under the bed, Manish throws a tennis ball at her and injures her. She misunderstands, thinking that Rohan threw the ball purposely. It is revealed that Rukma is a thief and is spotted thieving by Rohan, but she blackmails and mistreats Rohan so that he does not to reveal the truth to his family. She is then brutally murdered by the ghost of Manish on a lone road while returning home. Jhilmil is worried and attempts to find out why all of this is happening.

Jhilmil's sister Radhika invites her boyfriend Murli over when the whole family goes out to watch a movie. They have sex, but Murli suddenly vanishes. Radhika thinks that he is playing a game of "hide and seek". She drops her clothes to entice him. However, she sees ghosts staring at her and is horrified. When Jhilmil, Virag and Rohan come back home, they finds Murli's mutilated corpse on Radhika's bed and find Radhika outside, hanging dead from the tree.

Jhilmil is warned several times by a mad man, who tell her to vacate the house. It is revealed that Rohan's "imaginary friends" are ghosts who have been telling him to move out of their house. Virag is murdered by the ghosts, and after becoming a ghost himself, he tries to kill Jhilmil and Rohan. Inspector Bhupal Gorpade, who comes to help Jhilmil, is murdered as well. Bhupal also becomes a ghost and chases Jhilmil. Somehow, Jhilmil crashes her car onto the haunted tree and comes out. The car explodes, burning the tree and defeating the evil spirits. Then Jhilmil is admitted to the hospital along with Rohan.

At the house, the mad man is happy to see that the tree has been burned. He starts urinating on the tree, but it turns out that the spirits were not put to rest. The ghosts murder him as well. Back at the hospital, the doctor advises Jhilmil to take care. The film closes with Rohan's eyes turning black, similar to Manish's eyes, indicating that he has also been killed earlier and has become a ghost.

Cast

References

External links
 

2004 films
2004 horror films
Indian horror films
2000s Hindi-language films
Hindi-language horror films
Films about trees